The RETE Movement is a political party in San Marino.

History
The party was formed by several activist groups involved in the environmental, civic rights and arts. It contested the 2012 general elections, receiving 6.3% of the vote and winning four seats. Prior to the 2016 general elections the party joined the Democracy in Motion alliance, going on to win eight of the alliance's nine seats. In the 2019 elections the party was part of the Tomorrow in Motion alliance, winning eleven seats.

Election results

Grand and General Council

References

2012 establishments in San Marino
Democratic socialist parties in Europe
E-democracy
Feminist parties in Europe
Political parties established in 2012
Political parties in San Marino